The Škoda 1203, Škoda 1203 M, TAZ-Š 1203 and TAZ 1500 were the only Czech/Czechoslovak van cars ever produced. They were manufactured from 1968 to 1981 in Vrchlabí by AZV Škoda (typ 997). Five years later, production of the modernized type began (typ 776) and part of the production was moved to Trnava (TAZ). In 1981, the entire production was moved to the Slovakian city (Škoda TAZ). In 1985, another modernization came (TAZ 1500) and the 1,433 cm³ engine appeared. The vehicle was also manufactured in small-scale production in 1994–2010 by Ocelot Auto in Žacléř. Around 70,000 cars were produced. 

The first plans for production were drawn up in 1956. Inability to secure suppliers of parts and accessories in Czechoslovakia were the reason the production was delayed until 1968. The Škoda 1202 serves as the technical basis of the vehicle. There were several modifications during the production run, most of which had to do with the engine. The Škoda 1203 lasted for over thirty years without major structural interventions in production, and contributed significantly to the development of small businesses after 1989.

Gallery

Specifications

External links 

 Page of Ocelot, the producer since 1999
 History, details and pictures 
 Information about the Š 1203
 Page about the Š 1203/TAZ1500

Literature 
 
 

1203
Buses
Minibuses
Cars of the Czech Republic
Cars of Slovakia
Cab over vehicles
Vans
Pickup trucks
Rear-wheel-drive vehicles
Vehicles introduced in 1968
1950s cars
1960s cars
1970s cars
1980s cars
1990s cars